Devil in the Detail is a 2014 Ghanaian-Nigerian romantic thriller film directed by Shirley Frimpong-Manso starring Nse Ikpe Etim and Adjetey Anang.
It premiered at Silverbird Cinemas, Accra, Ghana, on 14 February 2014.
The film tells the story of a happily married couple whose relationship is torn apart by infidelity.

Plot

They have everything in their life, money, fame, happiness, they were a perfect married couple but their craze for sex and having affair with others ruined everything.

Cast
Nse Ikpe Etim as Helen Ofori
Adjetey Anang as Ben Ofori
Ama Ampofo as Claudia
Mawuli Gavor as Sam

References

External links
 

2014 films
Ghanaian drama films
English-language Nigerian films
English-language Ghanaian films
2010s romantic thriller films
Nigerian romantic thriller films
Films directed by Shirley Frimpong-Manso
2010s English-language films